Bulbophyllum amplebracteatum is a species of orchid in the genus Bulbophyllum.

Subspecies

References
 The Bulbophyllum-Checklist
 The Internet Orchid Species Photo Encyclopedia

External links 

amplebracteatum